Sällskapet is a Swedish rock band formed by Pelle Ossler, Joakim Thåström and Niklas Hellberg.

History
Sällskapet is a Swedish electronic post-industrial rock band that appeared in 2007 and is headed by the rock legend Thåström. Other band members include Pelle Ossler and Niklas Hellberg. The band existed as a secret hobby band for three years before appearing publicly in 2007 with the release of their first, self-titled, album. The album contained ten songs and a bonus DVD with music videos for five songs and the bonus track "Nattportiern". Sällskapets music is described as industrial, dystopian and with Kraftwerk influences. Jan Gradvall of Dagens Industri described it as what blues would have sounded like if it would have its roots in Ruhr instead of Memphis. Half the songs are completely instrumental.

On 10 April 2013, the band released their new album Nowy Port.

Band members
 Joakim Thåström – lead vocals, guitar
 Niklas Hellberg – keyboards, synthesizers, programming, sound effects, loops, scrap
 Pelle Ossler – electric guitar, acoustic guitar, piano

Discography

Albums

Singles

References
 Susanna Bergström Sällskapet – Hellberg, Ossler, Thåström dagensarbete.se Retrieved: 2009-08-04
 Fredrik Welander En livboj av cement, pt. III dagensskiva.com Retrieved: 2009-08-04
 Göran Holmqvist Ossler och Thåström har ett sällskap ihop hd.se Retrieved: 2009-08-04
 Maria K. Broman Thåströms nya band släpper cd expressen.se Retrieved: 2009-08-04
 Lasse Frack Omslaget mest spännande i Sällskapet fria.nu Retrieved: 2009-08-04
 David Borgerius Thåström släpper nytt - i gott sällskap tv4.se Retrieved: 2009-08-04

References

External links
 Official Homepage
 MySpace (not active)

Swedish musical groups